Stranger Things Have Happened is a 1994 album by former Monkees member Peter Tork. Although he had been performing since the 1960s, this was his first and only solo release.

The album includes several original compositions, and covered a range of styles from folk ("Giant Step") to hard rock ("Miracle") to pop ("MGB-GT").

Reception

Bruce Eder of AllMusic wrote "No one's going to believe it, but this is a good album, from Peter Tork no less. Most of the songs are sung with passion and the voice is much better than it was on, say, 'Shades of Gray' 28 years earlier. What's more, Tork reveals himself as a solid rocker, starting from a folk idiom but working with lots of wattage on the instruments and no trace of wimpy singer/songwriter affectation in the playing." He singles out the track, "'Higher and Higher', a folk/gospel song on which Tork mostly plays acoustic banjo, and which is so beguiling that one wishes he'd do an entire album in that idiom, style, and sound."

Reissue
In December 2020, British label 7a Records reissued Stranger Things Have Happened on CD and vinyl with new artwork and nine bonus tracks.

Track listing

Original 1994 release

2020 reissue

Tracks 15–17 not included on 2020 vinyl reissue.

Personnel 
Credits adapted from 1994 release.
Peter Tork – vocals, guitar, banjo, producer, liner notes
James Lee Stanley – acoustic guitar, backing vocals, producer, engineering, programming
Tommy Mars – keyboards
Pat Holloway – bass
Darren Elpant – drums
Michael Nesmith – backing vocals ("Milkshake", "MGB-GT")
Micky Dolenz – backing vocals ("Milkshake")
Timothy B. Schmit – backing vocals ("Stranger Things Have Happened")
Mel Vasquez – backing vocals ("Sea Change")
Mackenzie Phillips – backing vocals ("Giant Step")
Owen Elliott – backing vocals ("Giant Step")
Anita Sherman – backing vocals ("Gettin' In", "Higher and Higher")
Deborah Van Valkenburgh – backing vocals ("Tender Is")
Marc McClure – lead guitar ("Get What You Pay For")
Laurence Juber – electric guitar ("Milkshake")
Additional
Nick Thorkelson – artwork
Joseph L. Steiner, III – mastering

References

1994 debut albums
Peter Tork albums